Nepean may refer to:

Places

Australia
Nepean Bay, a bay in South Australia, 
Nepean Bay Conservation Park, a protected area in South Australia,
Nepean Bay, South Australia, a locality
Nepean Highway, Victoria
Nepean Island (Norfolk Island)
Nepean Island, Queensland
Nepean River, NSW
Point Nepean, Victoria
Nepean Hospital

Canada
Nepean, Ontario
Nepean Bay (Canada)
Nepean Point
Nepean Sound, British Columbia
Nepean Township, Ontario

India
Nepean Sea Road, Mumbai, India

Electorates
 Division of Nepean, former federal electorate in New South Wales
 Electoral district of Nepean, state electoral district in Victoria, Australia
 Electoral district of Nepean (New South Wales), former state electoral district in New South Wales
 Nepean (electoral district),  a Canadian electoral district covering Nepean and other parts of western Ottawa

Other uses
 Nepean (surname)
 Nepean Creative and Performing Arts High School, Sydney, Australia

See also
 Nepean Baronets
 Nepean Stars F.C.